Porlieria is a genus of flowering plants in the caltrop family, Zygophyllaceae. Species within this genus are shrubs or small trees of dry subtropical regions. The generic name honours Spanish ambassador Don Antonio Porlier de Baxamar.

Species
 Porlieria angustifolia (Engelm.) A. Gray
 Porlieria arida Rusby
 Porlieria chilensis I.M.Johnst. (endemic to Chile)
 Porlieria microphylla (Baill.) Descole et al.
 Porlieria hygrometra Ruiz & Pav.

Formerly placed here
 Guaiacum angustifolium Engelm. (as P. angustifolia (Engelm.) A.Gray)

References

External links
 The Plant List

 
Rosid genera